Plagiosternum (plae-jee-oh-ster-num, meaning "sideways breastbone") was a middle Triassic temnospondyl that is native to Spitzbergen.

References

Triassic temnospondyls of Europe
Plagiosauridae